Smith H. Hastings (December 27, 1843 - October 13, 1905) was a Union Army soldier in the American Civil War who received the U.S. military's highest decoration, the Medal of Honor.

Hastings was born in Quincy, Michigan on December 27, 1843. He was awarded the Medal of Honor, for extraordinary heroism on July 24, 1863, while serving as a Captain with Company M, 5th Michigan Volunteer Cavalry Regiment, at Newbys Crossroads, Virginia. His Medal of Honor was issued on August 2, 1897.

Colonel Hastings was a companion of the Colorado Commandery of the Military Order of the Loyal Legion of the United States.

He died at the age of 61, on October 13, 1905 and was buried at the Riverside Cemetery in Denver, Colorado.

Medal of Honor citation

See also

Jackson's Valley Campaign
Second Battle of Deep Bottom
Siege of Petersburg

Notes

References 

 
 

1843 births
1905 deaths
Burials in Colorado
Union Army officers
United States Army Medal of Honor recipients
American Civil War recipients of the Medal of Honor
People of Michigan in the American Civil War
People from Quincy, Michigan